The Huaibei–Suzhou–Bengbu intercity railway is a high-speed railway line currently under construction in China.

History
The feasibility study for the line was approved on 4 November 2020. Construction officially began in December 2020.

Route
The line takes a similar but less direct route than the existing Beijing–Shangqiu high-speed railway. It will have the following stations:
Huaibei North
Huaibei West
Suzhou West
Shuangduiji
Guzhen South
Bengbu South

References

High-speed railway lines in China
High-speed railway lines under construction